Mulla Idriz Gjilani was an Albanian patriot, a Muslim preacher, master orator and freedom fighter. He was born in the village of Velekinca in Gjilan, Ottoman Empire, (now Gjilan, Kosovo). The Gjilani family who have inhabited his birth region for centuries give their name to the town of Gjilani in Kosovo.

He took the first lessons in mejtep of Cernica, and graduated in 1911 to continue the high school in madrasah of “Atik” in Gjilan. After a long break, he graduated in 1926. At age 25, he became imam with title of Mullah and served in Karadak and Hogosht. In 1941, he took the post of bashvaiz, Ulama in Vakuf of Shkupi.

On January 20, 2015, he was posthumously awarded the "Honor of the Nation" decoration by the President of the Republic of Albania Bujar Nishani on the occasion of the 70th anniversary of the massacre of Gjilan.

Biography 
He was born in Velekinca in Gjilanat the time of the Ottoman Empire, Hajrullah Hasani's son of brotherhood Kurteshi and Sale Smakaj from Cërnica. The first lessons he received at the Mullah Halim Cernica's mejtep, after completing his studies in Ruzhdih of Gjilan for administrative work in 1911. The Balkan War prevented schooling and then could not attend the previous school because the school was closed. He attended his education at the Atar Medrese in Gjilan. After military service in 1924-225, he graduated in 1926 with Ixhezetnamé becoming an imam and received the title of mullah. He was in contact with the "National Defense of Kosovo" Committee and supported the Democratic Party of Ferhat Bey Drago, where he helped with the non-expulsion of the Albanian population in the Kingdom of Yugoslavia. He was the head of the imam at the Padić mosque in Karadak in 1927-32 and later in Hogosht of the Lower Moravian until 1938 when he went to the post of member of Mexhlis Ulema in Skopje, who administered the religious-religious life of Albanian lands under the state administration of Yugoslavia.

During the Second World War, as the first of the faithful of the Islamic religion in the Gjilan / Gnjilane Prefecture, Mufti and Sub-Mufti, and as a military imam of the IV Regiment of the Albanian Kingdom Army in Pristina. He commanded a paramilitary force under the flag of the Albanian Kingdom fighting for ethnic Albania against the Yugoslavs and the Bulgarians, which he handed over by the fall of 1944. After that he lived hiding from the Yugoslav Partisan Regime until the night of 25-26 November 1949, when Mulla Idrizi was burned alive by the Partisans. Months before his death he professed that Islam and Albanianism do harmonize.

References

1901 births
1949 deaths
People from Gjilan
Albanian collaborators with Fascist Italy
Albanian collaborators with Nazi Germany
Kosovo Albanians
Kosovan Muslims
Kosovan religious leaders
Kosovan politicians
Islam in Kosovo